Tubulin alpha-1B chain is a protein that in humans is encoded by the TUBA1B gene.

Interactions
TUBA1B has been shown to interact with PIK3R1.
Antibodies against tubulin alpha 1b can be used as markers for microtubules and spindles.

References

Further reading

External links